Navicula is a genus of boat-shaped diatom algae.

Navicula may also refer to:

 A vessel similar to a nef brought by the boat boy in Catholic and Anglican Churches
 Navicula de Venetiis or "little ship of Venice", an altitude dial used to tell time that was shaped like a little ship.

See also 
 List of Navicula species
 Navicular